Marlies Müller (born 9 June 1927) was a German athlete. She competed in the women's javelin throw at the 1952 Summer Olympics.

References

External links
  

1927 births
Possibly living people
Athletes (track and field) at the 1952 Summer Olympics
German female javelin throwers
Olympic athletes of Germany
Athletes from Cologne